Melrose is a small community in Silver Bow County, Montana, United States. The zip code is 59743. 

It was established in 1881 at the junction of the road from Corinne, Utah, and the smelter at Glendale. Situated on a scenic stretch of the Big Hole River, Melrose today is famous for trout fishing.

It is located in the Beaverhead–Deerlodge National Forest.

Climate
According to the Köppen Climate Classification system, Melrose has a semi-arid climate, abbreviated "BSk" on climate maps.

References
 https://web.archive.org/web/20110128195601/http://melrosemontana.com/ 
 

Populated places in Silver Bow County, Montana
Neighborhoods in Montana
Ghost towns in Montana